Sindhura Gadde is an Indian actress and former Femina Miss India World who also made to the semi-finals of Miss World Pageant in 2005.

Early life
Sindhura Gadde was born in Vijayawada, Andhra Pradesh. She was raised by her grandparents in Vijayawada, while her parents were working abroad in New Zealand. When she was 10 years old, she moved to New Zealand. After completing her studies in New Zealand, she started her career in media and fashion industry. She returned to India and completed her double degree in Pharmacology & Physiology and a diploma in modeling. She also took introduction courses in Japanese, Chinese and Arabic.

Career
She was crowned Femina Miss India World in 2005. When asked in the semi-final round which invention they would like to create and why, she replied she wanted to develop a natural remedy for cancer. After winning the contest, she said "she felt on top of the world at winning, and hoped to make India proud globally". Her fashion designer during the contest was Jayaram Ramineni
She was 1st runner up at Miss India NZ 2002 and 2nd runner up in Miss Auckland 2002.
Since her crowning, she has made several public appearances such as the TANA Conference 2005 in Detroit, Michigan and at the Hindu Samaj Temple in Wappingers Falls, New York. Sindhura made it to the semi-finals in the 2005 Miss World Pageant held in China.

Gadde made her debut in Tollywood in the movie Sangamam opposite Rohit Khurana. The Telugu movie was directed by Rasool Ellore and produced by P Ramana and Gavara Parthasarathy. She also did a bit of role in Heyy Babyy and signed Nagesh Kukunoor's Bemisal, but that film didn't go into production. She then went back to do a Telugu movie Amaravathi with director by Ravi Babu and Killer.

She also continued to host Femina Miss India South for 3 continuous years.

On 4 December 2010, she married her boyfriend of 10 years, Jonathan Ward in New Zealand.

Filmography

References

External links
 Sindhura Gadde's official Twitter page

Femina Miss India winners
Living people
Miss World 2005 delegates
Actresses from Vijayawada
Actresses in Telugu cinema
Indian film actresses
Actresses in Hindi cinema
21st-century Indian actresses
Female models from Andhra Pradesh
Year of birth missing (living people)